Benoît Baby (born 7 September 1983) is a former French rugby union footballer.  He usually played at centre, but also at fullback and fly-half and represented France.

Baby made his début for the national team during the 2005 Six Nations, against Ireland in Dublin.  France won the match 26 points to 19.  Baby was cited for head butting Brian O'Driscoll during the match. The Irish match was Baby's only appearance in the 2005 Six Nations, though he was capped twice again for France that year, in the losses against South Africa in Durban and Australia at Brisbane's Suncorp Stadium.  He was considered as very promising at his post until a series of relatively serious injuries stopped him in his progression. He came back with the French team during the 2008 Autumn internationals, scoring one penalty kick against Argentina, a game the French eventually won 12–6.

In 2010, he was selected in the French Barbarians squad to play Tonga on November 26.

External links 
 Benoît Baby on sporting-heroes.net
 Sport.fr 

1983 births
Living people
French rugby union players
Stade Toulousain players
ASM Clermont Auvergne players
Biarritz Olympique players
Rugby union centres
France international rugby union players